Hendrik Fernandez (7 November 1932 – 6 September 2014), sometimes known as Dr. Endi, was an Indonesian politician. He was born in Kupang. He was the governor of East Nusa Tenggara from 1988-1993. During his term as governor, Fernandez instituted the Revenue Increasing People's Movement as one of the development programs in the region. One of these programs was to plant one million cashew plant saplings.

Fernandez died at a Kupang hospital on 6 September 2014 due to a complications from a stroke that he had suffered from 4 years previously.

References

Governors of East Nusa Tenggara
1932 births
2014 deaths
People from East Nusa Tenggara
Indonesian Roman Catholics